The West Texas League was a Class D level minor league baseball league that existed from 1920 to 1922 and from 1928 to 1929.

1920-1922
The following teams played in 1920: Abilene Eagles, Ranger Nitros, Mineral Wells Resorters, Cisco Scouts, Gorman Buddies/Sweetwater Swatters and Eastland Judges.

The Abilene Eagles beat the Ranger Nitros in the playoffs to win the league championship. 

For the 1921 season, the Swatters, Eagles, Resorters, Nitros and Scouts returned to the league. The Resorters moved to Ballinger to become the Ballinger Bearcats. The Cisco Scouts changed their name to the Cisco Orphans. The Eastland Judges left the league and a new team, the San Angelo Bronchos, joined. The Abilene Eagles won their second championship in a row, beating the Swatters.

There were multiple new teams in 1922: the Amarillo Gassers, Lubbock Hubbers, Clovis Buzzers and Stamford Colonels. No team represented Ballinger, Cisco or Mineral Wells. Amarillo won the league championship, beating the Buzzers.

The league ceased play following the 1922 season.

1928-1929
The league began play again in 1928, lasting until 1929. The following teams played in 1928: San Angelo Red Snappers, Coleman Bobcats, Abilene Aces, Midland Colts, Lubbock Hubbers and Hamlin Pied Pipers/Big Spring Springers.

The Lubbock Hubbers were the only returning team from the 1922 season. The Red Snappers beat the Aces to take the league championship. 

New teams for the 1929 season included the San Angelo Sheep Herders and Big Spring Cowboys. The Ballinger Bearcats returned to the league. Coleman won the league championship.

Cities represented 
Abilene, TX: Abilene Eagles 1920–1922; Abilene Aces 1928–1929 
Amarillo, TX: Amarillo Gassers 1922
Ballinger, TX: Ballinger Bearcats 1921, 1929
Big Spring, TX: Big Spring Springers 1928; Big Spring Cowboys 1929 
Cisco, TX: Cisco Scouts 1920–1921
Clovis, NM: Clovis Buzzers 1922 
Coleman, TX: Coleman Bobcats 1928–1929 
Eastland, TX: Eastland Judges 1920 
Gorman, TX: Gorman Buddies 1920 
Hamlin, TX: Hamlin Pied Pipers 1928 
Lubbock, TX: Lubbock Hubbers 1922, 1928
Midland, TX: Midland Colts 1928–1929
Mineral Wells, TX: Mineral Wells Resorters 1920–1921 
Ranger, TX: Ranger Nitros 1920–1922 
San Angelo, TX: San Angelo Bronchos 1921–1922; San Angelo Red Snappers 1928; San Angelo Sheep Herders 1929 
Stamford, TX: Stamford Colonels 1922 
Sweetwater, TX: Sweetwater Swatters 1920–1922

Standings & statistics
1920 West Texas League
schedule
 Gorman (36–44) moved to Sweetwater August 7, first home game August 15. Playoff: Abilene 4 games, Ranger 3.

 
1921 West Texas League
schedule
 Mineral Wells moved to Ballinger May 20; Cisco disbanded July 6; Ranger disbanded July 9 Playoffs: Sweetwater defeated San Angelo in a one game playoff for the first half title Finals: Abilene 4 games, Sweetwater 2. 

1922 West Texas League
schedule
 Playoff: Amarillo 5 games, Clovis 1. 

1928 West Texas League
schedule 1st half - 2nd half
Hamlin moved to Big Spring July 3. Playoff: San Angelo 3 games, Abilene 2. 

1929 West Texas League
schedule
 Playoff: Coleman 3 games, Midland 3. Coleman won the title when Midland failed to appear for the seventh game.

References

Baseball leagues in Texas
Defunct minor baseball leagues in the United States
Sports leagues established in 1920
1920 establishments in Texas
1929 disestablishments in Texas
Sports leagues disestablished in 1929